North Middlesex District High School is on Main Street, Parkhill,  Ontario, Canada, at the corner of Elginfield Road and Parkhill Main Street (Formerly Highways 7 and 81), and serves the largely farming Municipality of North Middlesex. It offers a co-operative education program. It is the home of the "Marauders". It is the smallest 'regular' education high school in the Thames Valley District School Board.

The school emphasis differentiated instruction and assessment.

School goal
Improve student learning and achievement in all courses with emphasis on differentiated instruction and assessment to increase credit accumulation.

See also
List of high schools in Ontario

References

External links
 North Middlesex District Highschool
 School wiki home page

High schools in Middlesex County, Ontario
Educational institutions in Canada with year of establishment missing